Shashi Bhushan Sahai is an Indian author and former Director General of Police in Bihar.

Biography 
Shashi Bhushan Sahai was born in Arrah, the headquarters of Shahabad district (now Bhojpur) of Bihar. Sahai began his career as a college lecturer in Economics in 1950. He joined the Indian Police Service (IPS) in 1952 and rose to be the Director General of Police.

Bibliography
His books include:
Politics of Corruption: The Goddess that Failed, 1995
India: Twilight At Midday, 1997
South Asia: From Freedom to terrorism, 1998
The Alien Of Fakeland, a work of fiction published in London, 2001
Jihadi Terrorism: Making of a World War?, 2006
The Hindu Civilization: A Miracle of History, 2010

See also
 List of Indian writers
 Tapan Kumar Pradhan
 Abdul Rasheed
 Asghar Ali Engineer

References 

Indian political writers
Living people
Writers from Bihar
Indian police officers
People from Bhojpur district, India
Year of birth missing (living people)